Achnatherum calamagrostis (syn. Stipa calamogrostis)
is a species of flowering plant in the grass family Poaceae, known by the common names spear grass, needle grass, and silver spike grass. It is an ornamental grass native to the clearings in the mountains of central and southern Europe, which grows in mounds of blue-green leaves and long, silvery plumes.

Under the synonym Stipa calamagrostis, this plant, and the cultivars 'Allgäu' and 'Lemperg' have won the Royal Horticultural Society's Award of Garden Merit.

References

External links

Chiltern Seeds description

calamagrostis
Bunchgrasses of Europe
Taxa named by Palisot de Beauvois